The 1931 Illinois Fighting Illini football team was an American football team that represented the University of Illinois during the 1931 college football season.  In their 19th season under head coach Robert Zuppke, the Illini compiled a 2–6 record and finished in last place in the Big Ten Conference. End Fred Frink was selected as the team's most valuable player. Halfback Gil Berry was the team captain.

Schedule

References

Illinois
Illinois Fighting Illini football seasons
Illinois Fighting Illini football